The True Cross is a term used for the cross upon which Jesus was said to have been crucified, particularly as an object of religious veneration. There are no early accounts that the apostles or early Christians preserved the physical cross themselves, although protective use of the sign of the cross was common by at least the 2nd century. Post-Nicene historians such as Socrates of Constantinople relate that Helena, the mother of the Roman emperor ConstantineI, travelled to the Holy Land in the years 326–328, founding churches and establishing relief agencies for the poor. The late 4th-century historians Gelasius of Caesarea and Tyrannius Rufinus claimed that while there she discovered the hiding place of three crosses that were believed to have been used at the crucifixion of Jesus and the two thieves, St. Dismas and Gestas, executed with him. To one cross was affixed the titulus bearing Jesus's name, but according to Rufinus, Helena was not sure until a miracle revealed that this was the True Cross.

Many churches possess fragmentary remains that are by tradition alleged to be those of this True Cross. The acceptance of these relics is generally restricted to the Catholic Church, Eastern Orthodox Church, Oriental Orthodox Church, and the Church of the East, while Protestants and other Christians dispute their authenticity. The medieval legends that developed concerning the provenance of the True Cross differ between Catholic and Orthodox tradition, as do the exact dates of the religious festivals celebrating its rediscovery. A supposed fragment of True Cross held by Waterford Cathedral was tested by Oxford University radiocarbon experts in 2016 and found to date from the 11th century. Forging of relics for sale or to promote religious tourism (pilgrimage) was common during the medieval period but so was the creation of third-class relics by touching mundane items to those believed to be holy, in the belief some of its spiritual power would be transferred by the process. Over time, many such third-class relics came to be taken as the original articles they had once touched.

Provenance

The Golden Legend
In the Latin-speaking traditions of Western Europe, the story of the pre-Christian origins of the True Cross was well established by the 13th century when, in 1260, it was recorded by Jacobus de Voragine, Bishop of Genoa, in the Golden Legend.

The Golden Legend contains several versions of the origin of the True Cross. In The Life of Adam, Voragine writes that the True Cross came from three trees which grew from three seeds from the "Tree of Mercy" which Seth collected and planted in the mouth of Adam's corpse.

In another account contained in "Of the Invention of the Holy Cross", Voragine writes that the True Cross came from a tree that grew from part of the Tree of Knowledge of Good and Evil, "the tree that Adam ate of", that Seth planted on Adam's grave where it "endured there unto the time of Solomon". Alternatively, it reached Solomon via Moses, whose rod it was, and David, who planted it at Jerusalem.  It was felled by Solomon to be a beam in his temple but not found suitable in the end.

After many centuries, the tree was cut down and the wood used to build a bridge over which the Queen of Sheba passed on her journey to meet Solomon. So struck was she by the portent contained in the timber of the bridge that she fell on her knees and revered it. On her visit to Solomon, she told him that a piece of wood from the bridge would bring about the replacement of God's covenant with the Jewish people by a new order. Solomon, fearing the eventual destruction of his people, had the timber buried.

After fourteen generations, the wood taken from the bridge was fashioned into the Cross used to crucify Jesus Christ. Voragine then goes on to describe its rediscovery by Helena, mother of the Emperor Constantine.

In the Late Middle Ages and Early Renaissance, there was wide general acceptance of the account of the cross's history as presented by Voragine. This general acceptance is displayed in numerous artworks on the subject, culminating in one of the most famous fresco cycles of the Renaissance, the Legend of the True Cross by Piero della Francesca, which he painted on the walls of the chancel of the Church of San Francesco in Arezzo between 1452 and 1466, faithfully reproducing the episodes of The Golden Legend.

Eastern Christianity
According to the sacred tradition of the Eastern Orthodox Church the True Cross was made from three different types of wood: cedar, pine and cypress. This is an allusion to : "The glory of Lebanon shall come unto thee, the fir tree, the pine tree, and the box [cypress] together to beautify the place of my sanctuary, and I will make the place of my feet glorious." The link between this verse and the crucifixion lies in the words "the place of my feet", which is interpreted as referring to the footrest on which Jesus' feet were nailed and which appears on the Orthodox cross. (Compare with the Jewish concepts of the Ark of the Covenant or the Jerusalem Temple as being God's footstool, and the prescribed Three Pilgrimage Festivals, in Hebrew aliya la-regel, lit. ascending to the foot).

Tradition of Lot's triple tree
A further tradition holds that these three trees from which the True Cross was constructed grew together in one spot. A traditional Orthodox icon depicts Lot, the nephew of Abraham, watering the trees. According to tradition, these trees were used to construct the Temple in Jerusalem ("to beautify the place of my sanctuary"). Later, during Herod's reconstruction of the Temple, the wood from these trees was removed from the Temple and discarded, eventually being used to construct the cross on which Jesus was crucified ("and I will make the place of my feet glorious").

Empress Helena and the Cross

Eusebius
The Life of Constantine by Eusebius of Caesarea (died 339) is the earliest and main historical source on the rediscovery of the Tomb of Jesus and the construction of the first church at the site, but does not mention anything concerning the True Cross. Eusebius describes how the site of the Holy Sepulchre, once a site of veneration for the early Christian Church in Jerusalem, had been covered over with earth and a temple of Venus had been built on top. Although Eusebius does not say as much, this would probably have been done as part of Hadrian's reconstruction of Jerusalem as a new pagan city, Aelia Capitolina, after 130, following the destruction of the formerly Jewish city at the end of the Jewish Revolt in the year 70, and in connection with Bar Kokhba's revolt of 132–135. Following his conversion to Christianity, Emperor Constantine ordered in about 325–326 that the site be uncovered and instructed Macarius, Bishop of Jerusalem, to build a church on the site. Eusebius' work contains details about the demolition of the pagan temple and the erection of the church, but doesn't mention anywhere the finding of the True Cross.

Socrates Scholasticus

In his Ecclesiastical History, Socrates Scholasticus (born c.380) gives a full description of the discovery later repeated by Sozomen and Theodoret. In it he describes how Helena Augusta, Constantine's aged mother, had the pagan temple destroyed and the Sepulchre uncovered, whereupon three crosses, the titulus, and the nails from Jesus's crucifixion were uncovered as well. In Socrates's version of the story, Macarius had the three crosses placed in turn on a deathly ill woman. This woman recovered at the touch of the third cross, which was taken as a sign that this was the cross of Christ, the new Christian symbol. Socrates also reports that, having also found the cross's nails, Helena sent these to Constantinople, where they were incorporated into the emperor's helmet and the bridle of his horse.

Sozomen
In his Ecclesiastical History, Sozomen (died c.450) gives essentially the same version as Socrates. Without further attribution, he also adds that it was said that the location of the Sepulchre was "disclosed by a Hebrew who dwelt in the East and who derived his information from some documents which had come to him by paternal inheritance"although Sozomen himself disputes this accountso that a dead person was also revived by the touch of the Cross. Later popular versions of this story state that the Jew who assisted Helena was named Jude   or Judas but later converted to Christianity and took the name Kyriakos.

Theodoret

Theodoret (died c. 457) in his Ecclesiastical History Chapter xvii gives what would become the standard version of the finding of the True Cross:

With the Cross were also found the Holy Nails, which Helena took with her back to Constantinople. According to Theodoret, "She had part of the cross of our Saviour conveyed to the palace. The rest was enclosed in a covering of silver, and committed to the care of the bishop of the city, whom she exhorted to preserve it carefully, in order that it might be transmitted uninjured to posterity."

Syriac tradition
Another popular ancient version from the Syriac tradition replaced Helena with a fictitious first-century empress named Protonike, who is said to be the wife of emperor Claudius. This story, which originated in Edessa in the 430s, was transmitted in the so-called Doctrina Addai, which was believed to be written by Thaddeus of Edessa (Addai in Syriac texts), one of the seventy disciples. The narrative retrojected the Helena version to the first century. In the story, Protonike traveled to Jerusalem after she met Simon Peter in Rome. She was shown around the city by James, brother of Jesus, until she discovered the cross after it healed her daughter of some illness. She then converted to Christianity and had a church built on Golgotha. Aside from the Syriac tradition, the Protonike version was also cited by Armenian sources.

Catholic commemoration
According to the 1955 Roman Catholic Marian Missal, Helena went to Jerusalem to search for the True Cross and found it 14 September 320. In the 8th century, the Feast of the Finding was transferred to 3 May and 14 September became the celebration of the "Exaltation of the Cross", the commemoration of a victory over the Persians by the Byzantine emperor Heraclius, as a result of which the relic was recovered and returned to Jerusalem.

The True Cross in Jerusalem

Late antiquity
The silver reliquary that was left at the Basilica of the Holy Sepulchre in care of the bishop of Jerusalem was exhibited periodically to the faithful. In the 380s a nun named Egeria who was travelling on pilgrimage described the veneration of the True Cross at Jerusalem in a long letter known as her Itinerary, which she sent back to her convent:

Before long, but perhaps not until after the visit of Egeria, it was possible also to venerate the crown of thorns, the pillar at which Christ was scourged, and the lance that pierced his side.

The Perso-Byzantine Wars
The Sassanid Emperor Khosrau II ("Chosroes") removed the part of the cross held in Jerusalem as a trophy after he captured the city in 614. Thirteen years later in 628, the Byzantine emperor Heraclius defeated Khosrau and regained the relic from Shahrbaraz. He placed the cross in Constantinople at first, before restoring it to Jerusalem on 21 March 630. Some scholars disagree with this narrative, with Prof. Constantin Zuckerman going as far as to suggest that the True Cross was actually lost by the Persians and that the wood contained in the allegedly still sealed reliquary brought to Jerusalem by Heraclius in 629 was a fake. In his analysis, the hoax was designed to serve the political purposes of both Heraclius and his former foe, recently turned ally and father-in-law, the Persian general and soon-king Shahrbaraz.

Islamic rule and the Crusades

When Jerusalem fell to the Muslims in 638, Heraclius retrieved the True Cross but did not attempt to retake the city.

Around 1009, the year in which Fatimid caliph Al-Hakim bi-Amr Allah ordered the destruction of the Church of the Holy Sepulchre, Christians in Jerusalem hid part of the cross and it remained hidden until the city was taken by the European soldiers of the First Crusade. Arnulf Malecorne, the first Latin patriarch of Jerusalem, had the Greek Orthodox priests who were supposedly in possession of the Cross tortured in order to reveal its location. The relic that Arnulf recovered was a small fragment of wood embedded in a golden cross, and it became the most sacred relic of the Kingdom of Jerusalem, with none of the controversy that had followed their discovery of the Holy Lance in Antioch. Displayed in a jewel-encrusted housing of gold and silver, it was housed in a northern chapel at the Church of the Holy Sepulchre, overseen by its canons and protected by its knights. A second chapel beside it was overseen by the Syrian Orthodox and displayed another reliquary holding their fragment of the cross. The Latin fragment of the cross was repeatedly carried into battle against the Muslims. 

Over the course of each liturgical calendar, the Latin patriarch would oversee mass at the various churches around Jerusalem corresponding to the part of Jesus's life being celebrated. The celebrations of Holy Week closely involved the Holy Sepulchre and its fragment of the True Cross. During lauds on each Good Friday, the Latin relic was carried across the church to the chapel of Calvary on its south side, the supposed site of Jesus's crucifixion, and then venerated by the barefoot patriarch, the sepulchre's canons, and the assembled pilgrims until sext. Prior to the liturgy on Holy Saturday, four pilgrims selected by the patriarchpreceded by a thurifer and 2 acolytescarried the Latin relic from its chapel to the edicule of the Holy Sepulchre while the congregation waited with unlit candles. A New Fire would "spontaneously" light within the sepulchre. The crossbearer then would light his own candle from it, transit the entire church, and light the candle of the waiting patriarch. The candles of the canons and then the congregation were then lit from one to another, gradually filling the church with light.

After King BaldwinI of Jerusalem presented King SigurdI of Norway with a splinter of the True Cross following the Norwegian Crusade in 1110, the Cross was captured by Saladin during the Battle of Hattin in 1187. While some Christian rulers like Richard the Lionheart of England, the Byzantine emperor IsaacII, and Queen Tamar of Georgia sought to ransom it from Saladin, the cross was not returned. In 1219 the True Cross was offered to the Knights Templar by Al-Kamil in exchange for lifting the siege of Damietta. The cross was never delivered as Al-Kamil did not, in fact, have it. Subsequently the cross disappeared from historical records. The True Cross was last seen in the city of Damascus.

21st century status
The Greek Orthodox church presents a small True Cross relic shown in the Greek Treasury within the Church of the Holy Sepulchre at the foot of Golgotha. The Syriac Orthodox Church also claims a small relic of the True Cross (held in the Monastery of Saint Mark in Jerusalem), as does the Armenian Apostolic Church (in Armenia). According to the 15th-century Book of Ṭeff Grains, the emperor DawitI received four fragments of the True Cross around the year 1400 from Coptic Christians as thanks for his protection. The Ethiopian Orthodox Tewahedo Church claims these relics are still held at either Egziabher Ab or Tekle Maryam, two monasteries near the former imperial cemetery on Amba Geshen.

Dispersion of relics
An inscription of 359 found at Tixter, in the neighbourhood of Sétif in Mauretania (in today Algeria), was said to mention, in an enumeration of relics, a fragment of the True Cross, according to an entry in Roman Miscellanies, X, 441.

Fragments of the Cross were broken up, and the pieces were widely distributed; in 348, in one of his Catecheses, Cyril of Jerusalem remarked that the "whole earth is full of the relics of the Cross of Christ" and, in another, "The holy wood of the Cross bears witness, seen among us to this day, and from this place now almost filling the whole world, by means of those who in faith take portions from it." Egeria's account testifies to how highly these relics of the crucifixion were prized.  Saint John Chrysostom relates that fragments of the True Cross were kept in golden reliquaries, "which men reverently wear upon their persons." Even two Latin inscriptions around 350 from today's Algeria testify to the keeping and admiration of small particles of the cross. Around the year 455, Juvenal Patriarch of Jerusalem sent to Pope Leo I a fragment of the "precious wood", according to the Letters of Pope Leo. A portion of the cross was taken to Rome in the seventh century by Pope Sergius I, who was of Byzantine origin. "In the small part is power of the whole cross", says an inscription in the Felix Basilica of Nola, built by bishop Paulinus at the beginning of 5th century. The cross particle was inserted in the altar.

The Old English poem Dream of the Rood mentions the finding of the cross and the beginning of the tradition of the veneration of its relics. The Anglo-Saxon Chronicle also talks of King Alfred receiving a fragment of the cross from Pope Marinus (see: Annal Alfred the Great, year 883). Although it is possible, the poem need not be referring to this specific relic or have this incident as the reason for its composition. However, there is a later source that speaks of a bequest made to the 'Holy Cross' at Shaftesbury Abbey in Dorset; Shaftesbury abbey was founded by King Alfred, supported with a large portion of state funds and given to the charge of his own daughter when he was aliveit is conceivable that if Alfred really received this relic, that he may have given it to the care of the nuns at Shaftesbury.

Most of the very small relics of the True Cross in Europe came from Constantinople. The city was captured and sacked by the Fourth Crusade in 1204. The Chronica Regia Coloniensis relates that "After the conquest of the city Constantinople inestimable wealth was found: incomparably precious jewels and also a part of the cross of the Lord, which Helena transferred from Jerusalem and [which] was decorated with gold and precious jewels. There it attained [the] highest admiration. It was carved up by the present bishops and was divided with other very precious relics among the knights; later, after their return to the homeland, it was donated to churches and monasteries." The French knight Robert de Clari wrote that "within this chapel were found many precious relics; for therein were found two pieces of the True Cross, as thick as a man's leg and a fathom in length."

By the end of the Middle Ages so many churches claimed to possess a piece of the True Cross, that John Calvin  is famously said to have remarked that there was enough wood in them to fill a ship:

Conflicting with this is the finding of Charles Rohault de Fleury, who, in his Mémoire sur les instruments de la Passion of 1870 made a study of the relics in reference to the criticisms of Calvin and Erasmus. He calculated: supposing the Cross to have been of pine-wood (based on his microscopic analysis of the fragments) and giving it a weight of about seventy-five kilogrammes, we find the original volume of the cross to be . Four cross particles – of ten particles with surviving documentary provenances by Byzantine emperors – from European churches, i.e. Santa Croce in Rome, Caravaca de la Cruz, Notre Dame, Paris, Pisa Cathedral and Florence Cathedral, were microscopically examined. "The pieces came all together from olive." It is possible that many alleged pieces of the True Cross are forgeries, created by travelling merchants in the Middle Ages, during which period a thriving trade in manufactured relics existed.

Smyrnakis notes that the largest surviving portion, of 870,760 cubic millimetres, is preserved in the Monastery of Koutloumousiou on Mount Athos, and also mentions the preserved relics in Rome (consisting of 537,587 cubic millimetres), in Brussels (516,090 cubic millimetres), in Venice (445,582 cubic millimetres), in Ghent (436,450 cubic millimetres) and in Paris (237,731 cubic millimetres). The volume figures given by Smyrnakis for these objects—six significant figures and to the cubic millimeter—are undoubtedly the result of multiplying slightly approximate numbers and should not be seen as implying scientific accuracy of the highest order in a book written over a century ago.)

Santo Toribio de Liébana in Spain is also said to hold the largest of these pieces and is one of the most visited Roman Catholic pilgrimage sites. In Asia, the only place where the other part of the True Cross is located is in the Monasterio de Tarlac at San Jose, Tarlac, Philippines.

The Ethiopian Orthodox Tewahedo Church also claims to have the right wing of the true cross buried in the monastery of Gishen Mariam. The Ethiopian Orthodox Tewahedo Church has an annual religious holiday called Meskel (Geez for "Cross") that commemorates the rediscovery of the True Cross by Queen Helena. Meskel, also known as Demara, occurs on 17 Meskerem in the Ethiopian calendar, equivalent to September 27 in most years or September 28 during leap years.

The festival is known as the Feast of the Exaltation of the Holy cross in other Orthodox, Catholic, or Protestant churches. Churches that follow the Gregorian calendar celebrate the feast on September 14.

In February 2020, the Sevastopol district archpriest Sergiy Khalyuta said that a piece of the True Cross was bought by a donor, and was to be placed on board the Russian missile cruiser Moskva, which has a chapel on board. The ship sank in April 2022 during the Russian invasion of Ukraine. After the sinking, there was speculation that the fragment may have gone down with the ship.

Veneration

Saint John Chrysostom wrote homilies on the three crosses:

The Catholic Church, the Eastern Orthodox Church, Oriental Orthodox Church, the Anglican Communion, and a number of Protestant denominations, celebrate the Feast of the Exaltation of the Cross on September 14, the anniversary of the dedication of the Church of the Holy Sepulchre.  In later centuries, these celebrations also included commemoration of the rescue of the True Cross from the Persians in 628. In the Galician usage, beginning about the seventh century, the Feast of the Cross was celebrated on May 3. According to the Catholic Encyclopedia, when the Galician and Roman practices were combined, the September date, for which the Vatican adopted the official name "Triumph of the Cross" in 1963, was used to commemorate the rescue from the Persians and the May date was kept as the "Invention of the True Cross" to commemorate the finding. The September date is often referred to in the West as Holy Cross Day; the May date (See also Roodmas.) was dropped from the liturgical calendar of the Catholic Church in 1960 when the Roman Breviary was reformed by Pope John XXIII. The Orthodox still commemorate both events on September 14, one of the Twelve Great Feasts of the liturgical year, and the Procession of the Venerable Wood of the Cross on 1 August, the day on which the relics of the True Cross would be carried through the streets of Constantinople to bless the city.

In addition to celebrations on fixed days, there are certain days of the variable cycle when the Cross is celebrated. The Catholic Church has a formal Adoration of the Cross during the services for Good Friday. In Eastern Orthodox churches everywhere, a replica of the cross is brought out in procession during Matins of Great and Holy Friday for the people to venerate. The Orthodox also celebrate an additional Veneration of the Cross on the third Sunday of Great Lent.

Image gallery

See also

Notes

References

Citations

Bibliography

 .
 .
 .
 .
 . (French)
 .
 .
 .
 .
 
 
 .
 .
 .
 
 .
 .
 
 .
 .
 
 .
 . 
 . (Greek)
 .
 .
 .
 . (Latin)
 
 .
 . (German)
 .

Further reading

 . (French)
 . (French)
 .
 . (Italian)
 . (Italian)

External links

 Fernand Cabrol, "The true Cross": a Catholic view
 Relic of the True Cross in Wrocław, Poland

Catholic Church in Jerusalem
Christian folklore
Christian mythology
Christian relics
Christian terminology
Christianity in Jerusalem
Crucifixion of Jesus
Jesus and history
Relics associated with Jesus
Individual crosses and crucifixes
Church of the Holy Sepulchre
Helena, mother of Constantine I